Real United or also known as Real is a Thai sports equipment company.

Sponsorships

Football/Futsal

Club Teams 
Chonburi Blue Wave Futsal Club
Rajnavy Futsal Club
Surat Thani Futsal Club
Lanexang United F.C.
Nonthaburi F.C.

Presenter 
Panat Kittipanuwong Thailand national futsal Player 
Tairong Petchtiam Thailand national futsal Player

References

Shoe brands
Sportswear brands
Sporting goods manufacturers of Thailand
Thai brands